Jerzy Krzysztof Stanisław Zathey (15 April 1911 in Kraków – 27 April 1999 in Mszana Dolna) was a Polish historian of Medieval and Renaissance culture, librarian, manuscripts expert. He was a co-originator of the scientific method of elaborating medieval manuscripts. Publisher of numerous source documents (mainly in Latin and Old Polish language).

Zathey was a professor of the Jagiellonian University (since 1983), curator of the National Library of Poland (1938–1944), curator (1945–1981) and director (1957–1981) of Manuscript Department at the Jagiellonian Library, member of Medieval Academy of America (since 1981).

Notable works
 Katalog rękopisów średniowiecznych Biblioteki Kórnickiej (1963)
 Introduction to facsimile edition of Dzieła wszystkie Kopernika ("Copernicus complete works") vol. 1 (1972)
 Catalogus codicum manuscriptorum medii aevi Latinorum, qui in Bibliotheca Jagellonica asservantur vol. 1-4 (collective work; 1980–1988)

References

1911 births
1999 deaths
Jagiellonian University alumni
Polish medievalists
Academic staff of Jagiellonian University
Polish curators
Polish librarians
20th-century Polish historians
Polish male non-fiction writers
Corresponding Fellows of the Medieval Academy of America